David Ready is an American film producer and production executive, and the current EVP at Chernin Entertainment.

Life and career
A native of Boston and graduate of Washington University in St. Louis, Ready previously served as a production executive for Jerry Weintraub and subsequently at Di Bonaventura Pictures. He joined Chernin Entertainment in 2013. His credits include Transformers: Revenge of the Fallen, Salt, Red and Red 2, Jack Ryan: Shadow Recruit, Man on a Ledge, and Mike and Dave Need Wedding Dates. He also produced The Mountain Between Us (2017), Red Sparrow (2018), and Tolkien (2019), a biopic of J. R. R. Tolkien, all for Chernin. Ready most recently produced the 2021 Netflix horror Fear Street trilogy, beginning with Fear Street Part One: 1994, based on R.L. Stine's best selling book series, as well as the Francis Lawrence directed Slumberland, based on Winsor McKay's classic comic strip, Little Nemo in Slumberland.

Filmography
He was a producer in all films unless otherwise noted.

Film

References

External links
 

Living people
American film producers
Washington University in St. Louis alumni
Year of birth missing (living people)